The Bowers Namu II was a single-engine, two-seat, recreational aircraft, designed and flown in the United States in the late 1970s and marketed for homebuilding. It was designed by famed aircraft designer and Boeing historian Peter Bowers.

Development
The aircraft was a follow-on project to the designer's earlier Bowers Fly Baby design, if considerably larger; a low-wing cantilever monoplane with an inverted gull wing and fixed tailwheel undercarriage, designed to carry two persons (the Fly Baby was a single-seat aircraft).  The Namu II accommodated a passenger seated beside the pilot. The aircraft's somewhat portly lines provided the "Namu II" name, after Namu, the orca captive in Bower's home city of Seattle, Washington State.

Sales were disappointing, and out of the few plan sets sold, only four examples were constructed, one of which sported an orca paint job.

Operational history
In November 2022, there were no Namus remaining registered in the United States with the Federal Aviation Administration.

Specifications

References

 
 "Pete Bowers" Wind in the Wires Vol XIV No 10
 aerofiles.com

1970s United States sport aircraft
Homebuilt aircraft
Namu II
Single-engined tractor aircraft
Low-wing aircraft
Inverted gull-wing aircraft